Bermuda Dunes Airport  is a public use airport located in Bermuda Dunes, a town 13 nautical miles (15 mi, 24 km) east of the central business district of Palm Springs, a city in the Coachella Valley of Riverside County, California, United States. It is privately owned by Crown Aero, LLC.

The airport is home to Desert West Aviation, a local flight school, as well as Coachella Valley Aviation, providing A&P/IA service for airplanes and helicopters.

Facilities and aircraft 
Bermuda Dunes Airport covers an area of 105 acres (38 ha) at an elevation of 73 feet (22 m) above mean sea level. It has one runway designated 10/28 with an asphalt surface measuring 5,002 by 70 feet (1,525 x 21 m).

For the 12-month period ending December 31, 2019, the airport had an average of 38 aircraft operations per day: 64% transient general aviation and 36% local general aviation. At that time there were 66 aircraft based at this airport: 56 single-engine, 5 multi-engine, no jet, and 3 helicopters.

Past airline service 

Air LA, a commuter airline that was based in Los Angeles, operated scheduled passenger flights from the airport in 1989 with British Aerospace BAe Jetstream 31 turboprop aircraft nonstop to Las Vegas (LAS) and Los Angeles (LAX).

Instrument procedures 
STARs – Standard terminal arrivals
 CLOWD ONE
 SBONO ONE

IAPs – Instrument approach procedures
 RNAV (GPS) RWY 10
 RNAV (GPS) RWY 28
 VOR-C

Note: Special take-off minimums/departure procedures apply.

References

External links 
 Aerial image as of May 2002 from USGS The National Map
 

Airports in Riverside County, California
Coachella Valley